USS Chicopee is the name of two US Navy ships:

 , a large steamer used from 1864 until 1866
 , an oil tanker in service from 1942 until 1946

United States Navy ship names